Dorcadion equestre is a species of beetle in the family Cerambycidae. It was described by Laxmann in 1770, originally under the genus Cerambyx. It is known from Greece, Bulgaria, Hungary, Serbia, Romania, North Macedonia, Turkey, Russia, Moldova, Albania, and Ukraine.

Subspecies
 Dorcadion equestre equestre (Laxmann, 1770)
 Dorcadion equestre nogelii Fairmaire, 1866
 Dorcadion equestre reclinatum Kraatz, 1892
 Dorcadion equestre transsilvanicum Ganglbauer, 1884

References

equestre
Beetles described in 1770